This is a list of recipients of the Order of Sultan Mizan Zainal Abidin of Terengganu.

Supreme Class of the Order of Sultan Mizan Zainal Abidin of Terengganu (SUMZ)
  
Mizan Zainal Abidin of Terengganu, 26 May 2005
Abdullah Ahmad Badawi
Mohd Khalil Yaakob

Knight Grand Companion of the Order of Sultan Mizan Zainal Abidin of Terengganu (SSMZ)

Mizan Zainal Abidin of Terengganu, 6 July 2001
Sultanah Nur Zahirah
Idris Jusoh
Ahmad Said
Ahmad Razif Abdul Rahman
Ali Hamsa
Ahmad Samsuri Mokhtar
Mohammad Zuki Ali

Orders, decorations, and medals of Terengganu